The Coddington Cemetery is an early colonial cemetery located in Newport, Rhode Island, USA. It is sometimes called the Friends' Burial Ground, and has more colonial governors buried in it than any other cemetery in the state.

Description 

The Coddington Cemetery, located at 34 Farewell Street, is a very old colonial cemetery with 93 known interments, and has the largest number of interred colonial governors of any cemetery in the state. The six governors buried here are William Coddington, Nicholas Easton, William Coddington, Jr., Henry Bull, John Easton and John Wanton, all Quakers. None of the six governor graves has a governor's medallion like those found at the gravesites of most other colonial governors. The first known interment in this cemetery was that of Mary Moseley Coddington, the wife of Governor William Coddington, who died in 1647, and the last interment was that of James Easton who died in 1796.

The cemetery has been designated as Rhode Island Historic Cemetery, Newport #9, and is located on Farewell Street between Baptist and Coddington Streets in Newport. Within the cemetery is a monument honoring Governor William Coddington, erected on the 200th anniversary of the founding of Newport. The monument reads:

THIS MONUMENT
Erected by the Town of Newport
on the 12th. day of May 1839 being
the second Centeniel [sic] Anniversary
of the settlement of this town:

To the memory of
WILLIAM CODDINGTON ESQ
That illustrious man, who
first purchased this Island
from the Narragansett Sachems
Canonicus and Miantunomo
for and on account of himself and
Seventeen others his associates
in the purchase and Settlement.
He presided many years
as chief Magistrate of the Island
and Colony of Rhode Island
and Died much respected and lamented
on the 1st day of November in [1678]
[last line illegible]

Image gallery

See also
 :Category:Burials at Coddington Cemetery

References

Bibliography 

Online sources

 

1647 establishments in Rhode Island
Cemeteries in Rhode Island
Quaker cemeteries